Xiang Junbo (born 1957) is the former chairman of the China Insurance Regulatory Commission (CIRC).

He was previously chairman of the Agricultural Bank of China Limited (starting in January 2009). He obtained a Ph.D. in law from Peking University.

In February 2014, The New York Times reported that Xiang made a direct job plea to JPMorgan Chase Chief Jamie Dimon for daughter of a close friend.

On April 9, 2017, Xiang was placed under investigation by the Central Commission for Discipline Inspection of the Chinese Communist Party for "serious violations of regulations". Xiang was expelled from the Communist Party on September 23, 2017.

In 2019 he was jailed for bribery.

References 

Living people
Chinese bankers
Peking University alumni
High School Affiliated to Renmin University of China alumni
Businesspeople from Chongqing
1957 births
Alternate members of the 17th Central Committee of the Chinese Communist Party
Members of the 18th Central Committee of the Chinese Communist Party
Expelled members of the Chinese Communist Party
Agricultural Bank of China people
Chinese politicians convicted of corruption